Bert Numa (14 July 1883 – 14 June 1958) was an Australian rules footballer who played for the Essendon Football Club in the Victorian Football League (VFL).

Notes

External links 

		
Bert Numa's playing statistics from The VFA Project

1883 births
1958 deaths
Australian rules footballers from Victoria (Australia)
Essendon Football Club players